Halesworth may refer to:

 Halesworth, a town in Suffolk, England
 Halesworth railway station in Suffolk
 RAF Halesworth, a World War II airfield in Suffolk
 Tanya Halesworth, Australian TV presenter